Government Raja Harpal Singh College is a higher education institute in Harpalpur, Madhya Pradesh, India. It was established in 1989 by the state government under Motilal Vora, with Dr. S. K. Mehra as the first founder principal.

Initially, the college offered B.A. first-year classes, affiliated with the Awdhesh Pratap Singh University in Rewa. In 2003, in cooperation with the Jan Bhagidhari Samiti College, it also opened a Science faculty, teaching Zoology, Botany and Chemistry at undergraduate level. Post-graduate classes also started in Geography and Political Science. At present, the college is established in a private building. The Government allotted 15 acres of land for the college building, which is under construction.

References

Universities and colleges in Madhya Pradesh
Chhatarpur district
Educational institutions established in 1989
1989 establishments in Madhya Pradesh